Aduthathu ( Next) is a 2011 Indian Tamil-language thriller film directed by Thakkali Srinivasan. The film stars Nassar, Sriman, Vaiyapuri, Ilavarasu, Aarthi and Meenal. The movie is based on Agatha Christie's mystery novel And Then There Were None.

There was a controversy that the 2015 Kannada movie Aatagara is the remake of the film. At this point of time, the team of Aatagara arranged a special screening of the movie for Thakkali Srinivasan in Bangalore. Srinivasan clarified that it is not a remake of his film. He also praised Aatagara of being an extremely well made film. He also revealed that he had made a serial inspired from Agatha Christe's novel And Then There Were None in 1995. Later he made the film Aduthathu inspired by the same. For both these, Kannan Parameshwaran worked on the story. Kannan also wrote the story and co-wrote the screenplay for Aatagara inspired by the same novel. Srinivasan had said that anything similar was to the novel and not his film.

Cast
Nassar
Sriman as Prathap
Vaiyapuri
Ilavarasu
Aarthi
Meenal
Darshini
R. S. Shivaji
Vivek Anand
Chandru
Aruna
Sundari

Reception 
A critic from Behindwoods wrote that "Aduthathu is a movie that wants to ride on suspense throughout. It does quite well in that respect, but the script gets its timing wrong when it comes to unravelling the suspense and that is a major drawback".

References

Indian thriller films
Films based on And Then There Were None
Films set on uninhabited islands
2010s Tamil-language films
2011 thriller films
2011 films